Alex Bogdanovic didn't attempt to defend his 2008 title.
Xavier Malisse won in the final 6–4, 6–4, against Kevin Anderson.

Seeds

Draw

Final four

Top half

Bottom half

References
 Main Draw
 Qualifying Draw

Challenger Banque Nationale de Granby
Challenger de Granby